Squads for the 1980 AFC Asian Cup tournament.

Group A

Bangladesh 
Head coach:  Abdur Rahim

Head coach:  Su Yongshun

Head coach:  Hassan Habibi

Head coach:  Yang Song-Guk

Head coach:  Moussa Shammas

Group B

Kuwait
Head coach:  Carlos Alberto Parreira

Head coach :  Mohamed Che Su

Head coach:  Evaristo de Macedo

Head coach: Kim Jung-nam

Head coach:  Heshmat Mohajerani

References

External links
Yansfield - South Korea International Matches - Details 1980-89
Yansfield - China International Matches - Details 1980-89
Team Melli
China National Football Team Database
亚洲杯 at cnsoccer.titan24.com

AFC Asian Cup squads